The XXXI Corps is a corps of the Pakistan Army, commonly referred to as 31 Corps. It forms a major portion of the Pakistan Army, with its headquarters located in Bahawalpur, Punjab Province.

History 
The corps was raised in the end of 1980s and took over the assets of the former II Corps, which is presently based in Multan. It has more than three full-sized divisions and is responsible for the southern Punjab desert zone. 

In 1988, when the C-130 Hercules plane of President General Muhammad Zia-ul-Haq crashed near Bahawalpur, he was visiting XXXI Corps along with senior military aides.

Structure
Its present order of battle is as follows:

List of Commanders XXXI Corps

References
  

1988 establishments in Pakistan
Corps of the Pakistan Army
Military units and formations established in 1988